This list of space travelers is grouped by companies involved in their participation in spaceflights.

Axiom Space 
 Larry Connor – space tourist
 Eytan Stibbe – space tourist
 Michael López-Alegría – astronaut
 Mark Pathy – space tourist

Boeing 
 Barry Wilmore – astronaut
 Chris Ferguson – astronaut
 Jeanette Epps – astronaut
 Josh Cassada – astronaut
 Mike Fincke – astronaut
 Nicole Mann – astronaut
 Sunita Williams – astronaut

Scaled Composites 
 Brian Binnie – commercial astronaut
 Mike Melvill – commercial astronaut
 Peter Siebold – commercial astronaut

SpaceX 
 Akihiko Hoshide – astronaut
 Bob Behnken – astronaut
 Doug Hurley – astronaut
 K. McArthur – astronaut
 Kayla Barron – astronaut
 Matthias Maurer – astronaut
 Michael López-Alegría – astronaut
 Mike Hopkins – astronaut
 Raja Chari – astronaut
 Robert Kimbrough – astronaut
 Shannon Walker – astronaut
 Soichi Noguchi – astronaut
 Thomas Marshburn – astronaut
 Thomas Pesquet – spationaut
 Victor Glover – astronaut
Jared Isaacman – space tourist
Sian Proctor – space tourist
Hayley Arceneaux – space tourist
Christopher Sembroski – space tourist
Matthias Maurer – German astronaut 
Kayla Barron – astronaut
Raja Chari – astronaut
Thomas Marshburn – astronaut
Robert Hines – astronaut
Kjell N. Lindgren – astronaut
Jessica Watkins – astronaut
 Samantha Cristoforetti – spationaut
Travelers
Space travelers